Athanasios 'Thanos' Kalliris (Greek: Θάνος Καλλίρης, born August 13, 1962) is a Greek singer who was born in Athens. His father was a guitarist and composer, Titos Kalliris (1934–2013). In the 1980s, he was a part of the pop music band Bang alongside Vassilis Dertilis. In the 1990s, he wrote and sung pop songs and ballads, making a successful solo career for himself. He was also involved in the 1987 Eurovision Song Contest. His last album has the title "Gia hari sou boro" (For you I can) in which he has collaborated with several artists, among them with Vassilios Pallis, a talented composer.

Discography

Bijoux studio albums
 (1985)

Bang studio albums
 (1987) 
 (1990) 
 (1991)

CDs and other works
 (1991)  (I Condemn You)
 (1993)  (A lie for last)
 (1994)  (Some Summer)
 (1995)  (Christoúgenna Sto Galaxy)
 (1996)  (Just your soul)
 (1997)  (Call me)
 (1998)   (Love, Zero hour Love)
 (2000)  (I'm OK)
 (2001)   (Eternally)
 (2004)  (Thanks to You I can)
 (2005)  (Christmas With You)

Compilations
 (1992)  (1,500 Kisses... Fresh Hits)
 (1999)  (Vocalists)
 (2001)  (The Greatest Hits)
 (2007)  (Golden Successes)

Singles & EPs
 (2011)  (A New Day Will Break)
 (2012)  (Come find me)
 (2015)  (I want you to Want Me)
 (2015)  (Exclusively)
 (2017)  (I loved you here)
 (2022)  (I'm Going Out To Have Fun)

Cover Editions
 (2022)  (My Destruction - Rewind Edition 2022)

Duets
 (1991)  (Good night) - (ft. Natalia Germanou)
 (1993)  (Love, My Love) - (ft. Katy Garbi)
 (1993)  (The old's different) - (ft. Lambis Livieratos)
 (1993)  (You are Bellas) - (ft. Giorgos Alkaios)
 (1995)  (We won) - (ft. Lorna)
 (2009)  (Male Solidarity) - (ft. Michalis Rakintzis)
 (2013)  (Yours) - (ft. MC Φως)
 (2019)  (Love Wins In The End) - (ft. Mindtrap)
 (2021)  (Celebrate) - (ft. Bauer Merza)

External links
http://www.kalliris.gr/

1962 births
Living people
20th-century Greek male singers
Greek laïko singers
Singers from Athens
Eurovision Song Contest entrants of 1987
Eurovision Song Contest entrants for Greece
Greek male voice actors
Greek voice directors